In structural engineering, a rigid frame is the load-resisting skeleton constructed with straight or curved members interconnected by mostly rigid connections, which resist movements induced at the joints of members. Its members can take bending moment, shear, and axial loads.

The two common assumptions as to the behavior of a building frame are (1) that its beams are free to rotate at their connections or (2) that its members are so connected that the angles they make with each other do not change under load.  Frameworks with connections of intermediate stiffness will be intermediate between these two extremes.  Frameworks with connections of intermediate stiffness are commonly called semirigid frames.  The AISC specifications recognize three basic frame types: Rigid Frame, Simple Frame, and Partially Restrained Frame.

AISC standard
The AISC Steel Specification Commentary on Section B3 provides guidance for the classification of a connection in terms of its rigidity. The secant stiffness of the connection Ks is taken as an index property of connection stiffness. Specifically,
                                      Ks = Ms/θs
         where
            Ms = moment at service loads, kip-in (N-mm)
            θs = rotation at service loads, rads 

The secant stiffness of the connection is compared to the rotational stiffness of the connected member as follows, in which L and EI are the length and bending rigidity, respectively, of the beam.

Notes

References
 

Structural system
Construction